Alonzo F. Salisbury (1808–1855) was a member of the second, third and fourth Nebraska Territorial Legislatures from 1855–1858. Salisbury was the first official burial at Omaha's Prospect Hill Cemetery.

Biography 

Salisbury was born in Vermont in 1808. In 1855, he came to Omaha City in the Nebraska Territory as a stagecoach driver. Within a year he started a mill. Alonzo Salisbury was a direct descendant of Jonathan Salisbury, the captain of a privateer that served in many battles during the American Revolutionary War.

Politics 

Salisbury was a member of the Territorial Legislature, representing Douglas County.

In 1855 he opposed the original bill to grant suffrage to women, and in 1857 he was on the committee appointed to investigate the secession of Florence from Omaha. In 1858, Salisbury became the first burial at Moses Shinn's cemetery, later known as Prospect Hill Cemetery.

See also 
 History of Omaha, Nebraska
 Government of Omaha
 Founding figures of Omaha, Nebraska

References 

1808 births
1858 deaths
Politicians from Omaha, Nebraska
Pioneer history of Omaha, Nebraska
Members of the Nebraska Territorial Legislature
Burials at Prospect Hill Cemetery (North Omaha, Nebraska)
19th-century American politicians